Mount Drysdale is a  mountain summit located on the western border of Kootenay National Park in the  Vermilion Range, which is a sub-range of the Canadian Rockies of British Columbia, Canada. Its nearest higher peak is Rockwall Peak,  to the west. The mountain is part of what is known as the Rockwall which is an escarpment of the Vermilion Range.

History

The mountain's name was officially adopted in 1924 by the Geographical Names Board of Canada to honor Charles Wales Drysdale (1885-1917), a member of the Geological Survey of Canada who drowned in the Kootenay River on July 10, 1917, along with his assistant William Gray when their raft capsized and both were swept away while working on a field survey.   Mount Drysdale and Mount Gray form the buttresses on either side of Wolverine Pass.

The first ascent of Mount Drysdale was made by John Peck, Dr. Morley Tuttle and Dornacilla Peck (Dornacilla Drysdale), who was Drysdale's eldest daughter.

Geology

Mount Drysdale is composed of Ottertail limestone, a sedimentary rock laid down during the Precambrian to Jurassic periods and pushed east and over the top of younger rock during the Laramide orogeny.

Climate

Based on the Köppen climate classification, Mount Drysdale is located in a subarctic climate zone with cold, snowy winters, and mild summers.

References

External links
 Mount Drysdale weather forecast
 Parks Canada web site: Kootenay National Park

Two-thousanders of British Columbia
Canadian Rockies
Kootenay Land District